Nurhan Süleymanoğlu (born February 28, 1971) is a Kazakhstan-born Turkish former professional boxer who competed from 2001 to 2007. 

As an amateur, he participated at the 1996 Summer Olympics, where he was stopped in the second round of the light welterweight (63,5 kg) division by Cuba's Héctor Vinent. At the 2000 Summer Olympics he was stopped in the second round by Belarus' Sergey Bykovsky.

Süleymanoğlu won silver medals in the same division at the 1995 World Championships and the 1996 European Championships, as well as a gold medal at the 1993 European Championships.

Amateur highlights 
1993: World Championships in Tampere, Finland as a Light Welterweight:
Defeated Vukasin Dobrasinovic (Yugoslavia)  12-2
Lost to Hector Vinent (Cuba)  RSC 2
1993: 1st place at Mediterranean Games in Narbonne, France as a Light Welterweight:
Defeated Fathi Missaoui (Tunisia)  points
Defeated Nordine Mouchi (France)  points
Defeated Laureano Leyva (Spain) 4-2
1993: Winner at the European Championships in Bursa, Turkey as a Light Welterweight:
Defeated Jason Williams (Gal)  14-3
Defeated Peter Richardson (England)  8-5
Defeated Nordine Mouchi (France)  10-6
Defeated Armen Gevorkian (Armenia) 12-3
Defeated Oktay Urkal (Germany)  5-2
1995: 2nd place at World Championships in Berlin, Germany as a Light Welterweight:
Defeated Zoran Didanovic (Yugoslavia) 8-4
Defeated Besik Vardzelashvili (Georgia) 5-8
Defeated Bulat Niazymbetov (Kazakhstan) 9-4
Defeated Oktay Urkal (Germany) 10-3
Lost to Hector Vinent (Cuba) 4-7
1996: 2nd place at European Championships in Vejle, Denmark as a Light Weltwerweight:
Defeated Gabriel Oida (Romania) 14-12
Defeated Joszef Matolcsi (Hungary)  5-0
Defeated Nordine Mouchi (France)  11-8
Defeated Radoslav Suslekov (Bulgaria) 6-4
Lost to Oktay Urkal (Germany)  4-6
1996: Represented Turkey at the Olympic Games in Atlanta as a Light Welterweight:
Defeated Aboubacar Diallo (Guinea)  21-5
Lost to Hector Vinent (Cuba)  1-23
1997: Competed in the World Championships in Budapest, Hungary as a Light Welterewight:
Lost to Benameur Meskine (Algeria)  3-5
1998: 2nd place at European Championships in Minsk, Belarus as a Light Welterweight:
Defeated Mehmet Erarslan (Denmark) 8-2
Defeated Jacek Bielski (Poland)  8-2
Defeated Sergey Bykovsky (Belarus) 6-3
Lost to Dorel Simion (Romania) 3-9
1999: Competed at the World Championships in Houston, United States as a Welterweight:
Lost to Lucian Bute (Romania) 5-9
2000: 3rd place at European Championships in Tampere, Finland as a Light Welterweight:
Defeated Spiridon Ioanidis (Greece)  6-3
Defeated Mariusz Cendrowski (Poland) 6-2
Lost to Alex Leonev (Russia)  6-11
2000: Represented Turkey at the Olympic Games in Sydney, Australia as a Light Welterweight:
Defeated Michael Strange (Canada) 9-3
Lost to Sergey Bykovsky (Belarus) 38-40

Professional record

|- style="margin:0.5em auto; font-size:95%;"
|align="center" colspan=8|16 Wins (8 knockouts, 8 decisions), 9 Losses (4 knockouts, 5 decisions)|- style="margin:0.5em auto; font-size:95%;"
|align=center style="border-style: none none solid solid; background: #e3e3e3"|Res.|align=center style="border-style: none none solid solid; background: #e3e3e3"|Record|align=center style="border-style: none none solid solid; background: #e3e3e3"|Opponent|align=center style="border-style: none none solid solid; background: #e3e3e3"|Type|align=center style="border-style: none none solid solid; background: #e3e3e3"|Rd., Time|align=center style="border-style: none none solid solid; background: #e3e3e3"|Date|align=center style="border-style: none none solid solid; background: #e3e3e3"|Location|align=center style="border-style: none none solid solid; background: #e3e3e3"|Notes'''
|-align=center
|-align=center
|Loss|| 16-9 ||align=left| Juan de la Rosa
|||  ||   || align=left|  
|align=left|
|-align=center
|Loss|| 16-8 ||align=left| Jose Varela
|||  ||   || align=left|  
|align=left|
|-align=center
|Loss|| 16-7 ||align=left| Gabriel Martínez
|||  ||   || align=left|  
|align=left|
|-align=center
|Loss|| 16-6 ||align=left| Eromosele Albert
|||  ||   || align=left|  
|align=left|
|-align=center
|Loss|| 16-5 ||align=left| Nick Acevedo
|||  ||   || align=left|  
|align=left|
|-align=center
|Loss|| 16-4 ||align=left| Terrance Cauthen
|||  ||   || align=left| 
|align=left|
|-align=center
|Win|| 16-3 ||align=left| Lookton Jaytrong
|||  ||   || align=left|  
|align=left|
|-align=center
|Loss|| 15-3 ||align=left| Carlos Quintana
|||  ||   || align=left| 
|align=left|
|-align=center
|Loss|| 15-2 ||align=left| Artur Atadzhanov
|||  ||   || align=left|  
|align=left|
|-align=center
|Win|| 15-1 ||align=left| Thomas Davis
|||  ||   || align=left| 
|align=left|
|-align=center
|Loss|| 14-1 ||align=left| David Estrada
|||  ||   || align=left| 
|align=left|
|-align=center
|Win|| 14-0 ||align=left| Archak TerMeliksetian
|||  ||   || align=left| 
|align=left|
|-align=center
|Win|| 13-0 ||align=left| Jesús Soto Karass
|||  ||   || align=left|  
|align=left|
|-align=center
|Win|| 12-0 ||align=left| Jose Medina
|||  ||   || align=left|  
|align=left|
|-align=center
|Win|| 11-0 ||align=left| Charles Clark
|||  ||   || align=left|  
|align=left|
|-align=center
|Win|| 10-0 ||align=left| Jose Aponte
|||  ||   || align=left| 
|align=left|
|-align=center
|Win|| 9-0 ||align=left| Joshua Onyango
|||   ||   || align=left|  
|align=left|
|-align=center
|Win|| 8-0 ||align=left| Sal Lopez
|||  ||   || align=left|  
|align=left|
|-align=center
|Win|| 7-0 ||align=left| Vernon Meeks
|||  ||   || align=left| 
|align=left|
|-align=center
|Win|| 6-0 ||align=left| Abel Hernandez
|||  ||   || align=left| 
|align=left|
|-align=center
|Win|| 5-0 ||align=left| Anthony Wilson
|||  ||   || align=left| 
|align=left|
|-align=center
|Win|| 4-0 ||align=left| Larry Kenney
|||  ||   || align=left| 
|align=left|
|-align=center
|Win|| 3-0 ||align=left| Michael Soberanis
|||  ||   || align=left| 
|align=left|
|-align=center
|Win|| 2-0 ||align=left| Charles Sims
|||  ||   || align=left| 
|align=left|
|-align=center
|Win|| 1-0 ||align=left| Abel Hernandez
|||  ||   || align=left|  
|align=left|

References
 
sports-reference

1971 births
Fenerbahçe boxers
Welterweight boxers
Boxers at the 1996 Summer Olympics
Boxers at the 2000 Summer Olympics
Olympic boxers of Turkey
Living people
Turkish male boxers
AIBA World Boxing Championships medalists
Mediterranean Games gold medalists for Turkey
Mediterranean Games medalists in boxing
Competitors at the 1997 Mediterranean Games